Pygmodeon validicorne is a species of beetle in the family Cerambycidae. It was described by Bates in 1885.

Distribution and habitat
Pygmodeon validicorne is known to be found in Costa Rica.

References

Neoibidionini
Beetles described in 1885